Mel Nash (born c. 1955) is a retired American swimmer who won a gold and a bronze medal at the world championships in 1973 and 1975. He also won the 100 m backstroke event at the 1971 Pan American Games. In 1972, he was chosen by the Swimming World Magazine as the national high school swimmer of the year.

Nash studied at a high school in Monroeville, Pennsylvania, and then at the Indiana University. After graduating in 1976, he retired from swimming to become a swimming coach at the University of Texas at Arlington. Aged 22, he was the youngest head coach of any sport in the National Collegiate Athletic Association. After two years, his program was discontinued, and in the summer of 1979 Nash and his wife Carol moved to the Texas A&M University. He stayed there until 2004, raising more than 60 national team members. Although he was eventually let go by the school. In 1982 and 1986 he was recognized as Southwest Conference men's coach of the year, and in 1987 as women's coach of the year. In 1991 he was the head coach of the national junior team.

Nash has a daughter Kathryn and son Mel II; both are competitive swimmers. Nash senior himself continued competing in the 1980s in the masters category. He lives in Jacksonville, Florida, where together with his wife runs the North Florida Swimming club.

References

External links
Profile of Melvin Nash II

American male swimmers
American male backstroke swimmers
Indiana University alumni
Swimmers at the 1971 Pan American Games
World Aquatics Championships medalists in swimming

Pan American Games gold medalists for the United States
Pan American Games medalists in swimming
Medalists at the 1971 Pan American Games
20th-century American people
21st-century American people